Kileenemer Church is a medieval church and a National Monument in County Cork, Ireland.

Location

History

The church was built around the 12th century. A change in masonry style in the south wall shows that the church was extended eastwards at some point after its initial construction.

The etymology is uncertain; it may have originally been Cillín Íomair, "Ivor's little church."

Church

The church is rectangular, with the roof absent. The west wall has a central doorway with rounded arch. The antae at the corners of the west wall have been partly rebuilt. Many of the stones bear horseshoe-shaped mason's marks.

Around is an early ecclesiastical enclosure. A bullaun is nearby.

References

Religion in County Cork
Archaeological sites in County Cork
National Monuments in County Cork
Former churches in the Republic of Ireland